Ariosto is a novel by Chelsea Quinn Yarbro published in 1980.

Plot summary
Ariosto is a novel that takes place partly in an alternate universe where Italia Federata is ruled by the Medicis, and partly in a fantasy world in the mind of a fictionalized version of Lodovico Ariosto.

Reception
Greg Costikyan reviewed Ariosto in Ares Magazine #3 and commented that "Ariosto is well-written in a style that preserves the elan of the Renaissance without intruding greatly on the story. If you are as tired as I am of innumerable repetitive stories of valiant princes and heroic barbarians, you'll want to pick up a copy."

John O'Neill from Black Gate noted that Ariosto was "nominated for the World Fantasy Award [and] was also nominated for the Balrog Award, and placed 11th in the Locus poll for best Best Fantasy Novel of the year."

Reviews
Review [French] by Pascal J. Thomas (1981) in Fiction, #324
Review by David Pringle (1988) in Modern Fantasy: The Hundred Best Novels
Review [French] by Patrick Imbert (2004) in Bifrost, #33
Kliatt

References

1980 American novels